Millender is a surname. Notable people with the surname include:

 Juanita Millender-McDonald (1938–2007), American politician 
 Robert L. Millender - American lawyer, law partner of George W. Crockett, Jr.
Curtis Millender (born 1987), American mixed martial artist

See also
 Millender Center Apartments in Detroit, Michigan, United States